Emily Charlotte de Burgh, Countess of Cork (Irish: de Búrca; ; ; 19 October 1828 – 10 October 1912) was a British poet, writer, and member of the Irish aristocracy.

Biography
Cork was born on 19 October 1828 to Ulick de Burgh, 1st Marquess of Clanricarde and Harriet Canning, daughter of British Prime Minister George Canning. She was their second daughter. She married Richard Boyle, 9th Earl of Cork  on 20 July 1853. She was known as The Lady Emily Dungarvan until she became Countess of Cork in 1856, upon her husband's ascension to the earldom. The couple had seven children. Cork wrote poetry, short stories and articles which was published in periodicals such as The Pall Mall Magazine and in 1903 she published Letters to and from Charles Boyle, 4th Earl of Orrery and John Boyle, Earl of Cork and Orrery. She died in London in 1912.

Bibliography

Poems
 To Friends after Death, (1886)
 Les Laveuses de Nuit, (1900)
 Work On—Stand Fast, (1898)

Articles

 The Chronicle of a Street, (1895)
 Early Romances of the Century, (1896)
 Etiquette: Its Uses, Abuses, Changes, and Phases, (1901)
 "Our Neighbour", (1891)
 Society Again!, (1893)
 Three Types of Womanhood, (1889)
 Types of Character in the Book of Proverbs, (1892)
 A Woman's View, (1897)

Short stories, Books
 The True Legend of the Zephyr and the Rose, (1893)
The Orrery Papers, Vols I and II, (1903)

References and sources

1828 births
1912 deaths
19th-century Irish women writers
Anglo-Irish women poets
Irish women short story writers
19th-century Irish short story writers
Daughters of British marquesses
Emily
Cork
19th-century Irish poets
Irish women poets